Gerald F. Apa (born August 18, 1940) is an American former politician. He served in the South Dakota House of Representatives from 1997 to 2000, in the South Dakota State Senate from 2001 to 2008, and as mayor of Lead, South Dakota from 2014-2016.

Career
Apa was County Commissioner for Lawrence County, South Dakota from 1977-1986 and 1993-1996. He was a member of the South Dakota House of Representatives from 1997-2000 and of the South Dakota State Senate from 2001-2008. In the House he served on the Local Government, Taxation, and Transportation Committees. In the Senate he served on the Approriations Committee, serving six years as chair of the committee. After serving in state politics, he lived in Lead, South Dakota and became a leader in local civic organizations. He became mayor of Lead in 2014, serving until 2016.

References

1940 births
Living people
People from Scottsbluff, Nebraska
People from Lead, South Dakota
Businesspeople from South Dakota
Republican Party members of the South Dakota House of Representatives
Republican Party South Dakota state senators